Kraków Główny, in English Kraków Main, is the largest and the most centrally located railway station in Kraków, Poland.

The railway station was situated in a historical building, constructed between 1844 and 1847 by Rosenbaum, which lies parallel to the tracks. The design was chosen to allow for future line expansion. The station was initially a terminus of the KrakówUpper Silesia Railway (Kolej Krakowsko-Górnośląska). Trains entered the trainshed via a brick archway at the northern end of the station which was almost doubled in size in 1871. In 2014, a new building was opened.

History and early connections
The station opened on 13 October 1847, with the first train leaving for Mysłowice (the point where the Austrian, German and Russian Empires adjoined during era of the partitions of Poland).

The railway line was extended eastwards in 1856, when the first section to Dębica (then Dembitz in the Habsburg Empire) of the future Galician Railway of Archduke Charles Louis connecting Kraków with Lwów (then Lemberg) in Galicia. The increasing traffic resulted in the station's modernization and enlargement in several stages between 1869 and 1894. The next substantial expansion took place in the 1930s in the reborn Polish Republic.  At that time the northern brick wall and trainshed were demolished, the latter replaced by individual platform roofs.

Underground expansion and revitalisation
A new urban shopping mall, Galeria Krakowska (Kraków Mall), opened in September 2006 with adjacent parking for 1,400 cars.  The construction of the Galeria Krakowska and remodeling of the area in front of the main station building means that taxis are no longer able to drive up to the station or collect passengers directly from the main entrance; however, the free overhead parking and passenger pick-up right above the tracks is now closer to the platforms, accessible via a convenient elevator.

The station has undergone a multi-million złoty refurbishment to improve passengers' experience.

A new transport interchange has been developed. This includes a bus station to the east, and an express tram line under the station which opened in December 2008.

A new underground ticket hall opened in February 2014, with waiting rooms, travel centers and other amenities. This is located to the north of the earlier platform underpass, and connected to the platforms by escalators. It also provides two new direct exits/entrances to the station complex, one from the lower level of Galeria Krakowska and another from the Regional Bus Station located to the east of the railway station. The current platform underpass will also be refurbished. As part of this large investment all platforms and tracks have been replaced.

Train services
The station is served by the following service(s):

EuroCity services (EC) (EC 95 by DB) (IC by PKP) Berlin - Frankfurt (Oder) - Rzepin - Wrocław – Katowice – Kraków – Rzeszów – Przemyśl
Express Intercity Premium services (EIP) Warsaw - Kraków
Express Intercity Premium services (EIP) Gdynia/Kołobrzeg - Warsaw - Kraków (- Rzeszów)
Express Intercity services (EIC) Warsaw - Kraków - Zakopane 
Intercity services (IC) Warsaw - Kraków - Zakopane 
Intercity services (IC) Gdynia - Gdańsk - Bydgoszcz - Łódź - Czestochowa — Krakow — Zakopane
 Intercity services (IC) Łódź Fabryczna — Tomaszów Mazowiecki/Częstochowa — Kraków Główny
Intercity services (IC) Poznań - Ostrów Wielkopolski - Kępno - Lubliniec - Częstochowa - Kraków 
Intercity services (IC) Kołobrzeg - Piła - Poznań - Wrocław - Opole - Kraków
Intercity services (IC) Zielona Góra - Wrocław - Opele - Częstochowa - Kraków - Rzeszów - Przemyśl
Intercity services (IC) Ustka - Koszalin - Poznań - Wrocław - Katowice - Kraków - Rzeszów - Przemyśl
Intercity services (TLK) Poznań - Ostrów Wielkopolski - Kępno - Lubliniec - Częstochowa - Kraków 
Intercity services (TLK) Gdynia Główna — Zakopane 
Intercity services (TLK) Kołobrzeg — Gdynia Główna — Warszawa Wschodnia — Kraków Główny
Regional services (PR) Katowice — Kraków 
Regional services (PR) Katowice — Kraków — Dębica 
Regional services (PR) Zakopane - Nowy Targ - Chabówka - Skawina - Kraków Główny 
Regional service (PR) Bielsko-Biała Główna — Wadowice - Kraków Główny
Regional services (PR) Kraków - Bochnia - Tarnów - Dębica - Rzeszów
Regional services (PR) Kraków - Bochnia - Tarnów - Nowy Sącz - Piwniczna
Regional services (PR) Kraków - Bochnia - Tarnów - Nowy Sącz - Piwniczna - Krynica-Zdrój
Regional Service (KMŁ)   Kraków Lotnisko (Airport) - Kraków Gł. - Kopalnia - Wieliczka Rynek-Kopalnia
Regional Service (KMŁ)  Sędziszów - Miechów - Kraków Gł. - Skawina - Podbory Skawińskie - Przeciszów
Regional Service (KMŁ)  Oświęcim (Auschwitz) - Trzebinia - Kraków Gł. - Tarnów
Regional Service (KŚ)  Katowice - Mysłowice - Trzebinia - Krzeszowice - Kraków Gł.

References

External links
 

Railway stations in Poland opened in 1847
Railway stations in Kraków
Railway stations in Lesser Poland Voivodeship
Railway stations served by Przewozy Regionalne InterRegio
1847 establishments in the Austrian Empire